River King (North America) or Harvest Fishing (PAL) (known in Japan as ), and originally released in English as Legend of the River King, is a fishing-themed role playing video game series by Marvelous. The series has releases over 6 video game systems. Of these, 4 have been released in America.

In addition to the River King series a spinoff series of saltwater fishing games has also been released called Umi no Nushi Tsuri. The series has been released for the Game Boy, Super Nintendo, PlayStation, and Wii.

In North America and PAL regions the series was marketed as a spinoff of the Harvest Moon (Bokujō Monogatari) franchise (despite the Nushi Tsuri franchise being the older one in Japan).

Games

Kawa no Nushi Tsuri titles

Related titles

See also
Story of Seasons

References

External links
Marvelous Interactive  - Japanese game developer and publisher
Ushi No Tane - English game help site
Nushi Tsuri Guide  - Japanese game help site

Lists of video games by franchise
Marvelous Entertainment
Marvelous Entertainment franchises
Natsume (company) games
Fishing video games
Victor Interactive Software games